Werauhia gigantea is a plant species in the genus Werauhia. This species is native to Venezuela.

References

gigantea
Flora of Venezuela